Huashi may refer to:

Place Name
The Huashi neighborhood (花市) of Beijing, which encompasses parts of the Chongwenmen Outer and East Huashi Subdistricts in Dongcheng District, or any other locale in China whose name is romanized as Huashi including: 
Town or Township
Huashi Town (花石镇), Xiangtan County, Xiangtan, Hunan Province
Huashi Town (花石镇), in Yuzhou, Henan, Xuchang, Henan Province
Huashi Town (华士镇), Jiangyin, Jiangsu Province
Huashi Town (华石镇), Luoding, Yunfu, Guangdong Province
Huashi Township (花石乡), Jinzhai County, Lu'an, Anhui Province
Village
Huashi Village (花石村) in Wangshiwan Township, Zhuzhou, Hunan Province.
Huashi Village (华石村) in Wangshiwan Township, Zhuzhou, Hunan Province. 
Huashi Village (滑石村) in Xihe Township, Xinhua County, Hunan Province.
Huashi Village (花石村) in Tongguan Subdistrict, Wangcheng District, Changsha, Hunan Province.
Huashi Village (华实村) in Dabuqiao Subdistrict, Louxing District, Loudi, Hunan Province.
Metro Station
South China Normal University Station or Huashi Station （华师站） of the Guangzhou Metro
Huashi (花市), lit. Flower City, the nickname of Hualien City, Hualien County, Taiwan, ROC.
Porcelain
Huashi, a type of soft paste Chinese porcelain.
Traditional Chinese medicine
Talc or talcum (滑石)